Mason Jones may refer to:
 Mason Jones (hornist)
 Mason Jones (guitarist)
 Mason Jones (basketball)
 Mason Jones (fighter)